Camp Murray is located adjacent to Joint Base Lewis–McChord, Washington. It is home to the Washington Army National Guard, Washington State Guard and the Washington Air National Guard.

See also
 Washington National Guard Museum 
 Washington Military Department

References

External links

 https://web.archive.org/web/20130205150018/http://washingtonguard.org/about/contact.shtml
 https://web.archive.org/web/20130401163250/http://mil.wa.gov/jobs/directions.shtml

Installations of the United States Army in Washington (state)
Installations of the United States Air National Guard
Buildings and structures in Pierce County, Washington
1917 establishments in Washington (state)